Trump is a ghost town in Park County, Colorado, United States.

History
Trump was an agricultural and ranching settlement which prospered for a short time during the 1920s and early 1930s.

Trump had a store, and a post office which served neighboring ranches.  Trump also hosted rodeo competitions between local ranch hands.

The population of Trump had declined to three people by 1936.

In 1937, a unique sandstone was identified in the vicinity by J. H. Johnson, and was named "Trump conglomerate" after the nearby settlement.

References

Ghost towns in Colorado
Former populated places in Park County, Colorado